The Glamorgan flag is the flag of the county of Glamorgan. It was registered with the Flag Institute on 24 September 2013.



Design
The flag is a banner of the arms of Iestyn ap Gwrgant, the last ruler of the Kingdom of Morgannwg, the predecessor of the county of Glamorgan. The design of three silver chevrons on a red field features in the coats of arms of many of the councils in the area, including those of the Vale of Glamorgan and of former Mid, South and West Glamorgan. It also features on the flag of Cardiff where a dragon is holding the banner aloft symbolising Cardiff's status as county town of Glamorgan.

The Pantone colours for the flag are:
Red 186
White

References

External links
[ Flag Institute – Glamorgan]
Glamorgan Flag campaign
Glamorgan at Flags of the World

2013 establishments in Wales
Glamorgan
Glamorgan
Glamorgan
Glamorgan